"Total Eclipse of the Heart" is a song recorded by Welsh singer Bonnie Tyler. It was written and produced by Jim Steinman, and released on Tyler's fifth studio album, Faster Than the Speed of Night (1983). The song was released as a single by CBS/Columbia in 1983.

The song became Tyler's biggest career hit, topping the UK Singles Chart, and becoming the fifth-best-selling single in 1983 in the United Kingdom. In the United States, the single spent four weeks at the top of the charts, keeping another Steinman penned song "Making Love Out of Nothing at All" by Air Supply from reaching the top spot (a song Tyler would later cover in 1995), and it was Billboards number-six song of the year for 1983. The song was nominated for the Grammy Award for Best Female Pop Vocal Performance.

Worldwide, the single has sales in excess of 6 million copies and was certified gold by the Recording Industry Association of America (RIAA) for sales of over 1 million copies after its release, updated to platinum in 2001 when the certification threshold changed. In 2015, the song was voted by the British public as the nation's third favourite 1980s number one in a poll for ITV.

Background and composition
After her contract with RCA Records ended in 1981, Tyler found a new manager in David Aspden. After seeing Meat Loaf perform "Bat Out of Hell" live on The Old Grey Whistle Test, she approached Meat Loaf's producer, Jim Steinman, and asked him to be her producer. Tyler aimed to create an album utilizing the Wall of Sound production techniques of Phil Spector, and she believed that Steinman was the only person who could create the same sound, as Spector had mostly retired from the music business. Tyler visited Steinman in his apartment in New York in April 1982 with her manager, where she was presented with two tracks: "Have You Ever Seen the Rain?" and "Goin' Through the Motions". She stated that had she not liked the songs Steinman played for her, he would have rejected Tyler's invitation to collaborate. She returned to his studio apartment weeks later, where Steinman and Rory Dodd performed "Total Eclipse of the Heart" for her. Steinman also hand-picked the recording band for the song, which included Dodd as a featured vocalist (the "Turn around..." refrain).

The lyric "Turn around, bright eyes" had originally appeared in Steinman's 1969 college musical The Dream Engine. Steinman had originally written the song's verse melody for his score to the 1980 film A Small Circle of Friends.

"Total Eclipse of the Heart" had to be shortened for radio play. Tyler did not believe that the song was radio-friendly at its full length; the song was reduced from seven minutes and two seconds to four minutes and thirty seconds.

The power ballad became Tyler's highest-charting song in several countries, peaking at No. 1 in the United States, South Africa, Australia, New Zealand, Canada and the United Kingdom. At its peak, it sold 60,000 copies per day and approximately 6 million copies in total. It won the Variety Club award in the UK for best single of 1983. The song also made number 82 of VH1's top 100 love songs.

Tyler told Record Mirror that she thought the song was about "someone who wants to love so badly she's lying there in complete darkness."

Steinman said in an interview with Playbill about the inclusion of the song in his 1997 musical Dance of the Vampires:with 'Total Eclipse of the Heart', I was trying to come up with a love song and I remembered I actually wrote that to be a vampire love song. Its original title was 'Vampires in Love' because I was working on a musical of Nosferatu, the other great vampire story. If anyone listens to the lyrics, they're really like vampire lines. It's all about the darkness, the power of darkness and love's place in the dark...He also told People that he thought Tyler sounded like John Fogerty and wrote the song "to be a showpiece for her voice." Tyler described the song as "a challenge [to sing]," stating that she "[doesn't] like songs that anybody can sing. I like songs that need a lot of energy." After Steinman presented her with the song, she told The Times, "I just had shivers right up my spine...I couldn't wait to actually get in and record it."

According to Meat Loaf, Steinman had written the song, along with "Making Love Out of Nothing at All", for Meat Loaf's album Midnight at the Lost and Found; however, Meat Loaf's record company refused to pay Steinman, and he wrote separate songs himself. "Total Eclipse of the Heart" was given to Bonnie Tyler and "Making Love Out of Nothing at All" to Air Supply. Tyler has denied this claim. "Meat Loaf was apparently very annoyed that Jim gave that to me," Tyler stated. "But Jim said he didn't write it for Meat Loaf, that he only finished it after meeting me." Steinman said to People that he considered it "an aria to me, a wagnerian-like onslaught of sound and emotion. I wrote it to be a showpiece for her voice."

In an interview with journalist Mick Wall shortly after the release of Meat Loaf's 2006 album Bat Out of Hell III: The Monster Is Loose, Steinman stated: "I didn't write [Total Eclipse of the Heart] for anyone but Bonnie." Steinman believed that CBS were expecting him to write something similar to "It's a Heartache", but he had different ideas.

Music video

The music video for "Total Eclipse of the Heart" was directed by Russell Mulcahy and was filmed on location at the Holloway Sanatorium, a large Victorian Gothic hospital near Virginia Water, Surrey, England. The surrealist video features Tyler clad in white, dreaming or fantasizing about students in a boys' boarding school. Young men are seen dancing and participating in various school activities and singing in a choir.

The video received two nominations at the Billboard Video Music Awards in 1983 for Best Performance by a Female and Most Effective Use of Symbolism.

A long-running urban legend is that the boy who appears throughout the video and who shakes Tyler's hand at the end is former Italian footballer Gianfranco Zola. In a 2012 interview, Zola confirmed that he did not appear in the video.

Live performances
Since the song's release, Tyler has performed "Total Eclipse of the Heart" in all of her concerts. "I sing it much better now than I used to," she told The Huffington Post. "I think my voice is probably not as husky as it was, I think it's mellowed a bit." The song was performed at the 26th Annual Grammy Awards, held at the Shrine Auditorium, Los Angeles, on 28 February 1984.

Bonnie Tyler sang "Total Eclipse of the Heart" live on board a Royal Caribbean cruise ship during the solar eclipse of 21 August 2017, backed by DNCE.

Live recordings of Tyler performing the song have been released on her albums Bonnie Tyler Live (2006) and Live in Germany 1993 (2011). Video performances have also been released on Tyler's DVDs, Bonnie on Tour (2006) and the DVD edition of Live in Germany 1993.

Critical reception
Mike DeGagne from AllMusic retrospectively described "Total Eclipse of the Heart" as "one of the finest ballads ever to hit radio." He noted the "lush instrumentation" and said that Tyler's voice "produced the perfect type of 'desperate lovelorn' effect to suit the romantic lyrics." He described Roy Bittan's piano playing as "dreamy" and described Tyler's voice as "wonderfully gritty." Donald A. Guarisco, also from AllMusic, retrospectively reviewed Faster Than the Speed of Night and noted the song as an "epic ballad", describing the whole album as "rock at its most melodramatic." Jim Beviglia from American Songwriter said that Tyler's raspy vocals helped to legitimize the "melodrama inherent in the lyrics," and described the song as a "garment-rending, chest-beating [and] emotionally exhausting ballad" that suits the throes of a turbulent relationship.

Impact
In a 2013 UK survey, the song came first in a list of most popular songs to sing in the shower, above songs by Justin Bieber, Robbie Williams, One Direction and Elton John. In 2015, the song was voted by the British public as the nation's third-favourite 1980s number one in a poll for ITV.

The song's lyrics compare an ended romance with an eclipse. The song often receives publicity during solar eclipses and lunar eclipses. "Total Eclipse of the Heart" received substantial media attention during the solar eclipse of 20 March 2015. Tyler's version received a 214% increase of Spotify streams throughout the day. A similar impact was experienced during the solar eclipse of 21 August 2017, when Nielsen Music reported a 503% increase in record sales. Around that time, the song hit number one on the iTunes chart.

Formats and track listings
 UK 7-inch single"Total Eclipse of the Heart" – 4:29
"Take Me Back" – 5:05

 US 7-inch single"Total Eclipse of the Heart" – 4:29
"Straight from the Heart" – 3:38

 UK 12-inch single"Total Eclipse of the Heart" – 6:59
"Take Me Back" – 5:22

Charts

Weekly charts

Year-end charts

All-time charts

Sales and certifications

Credits and personnel
Credits adapted from AllMusic (from the album, Faster Than the Speed of Night):
Bonnie Tyler – lead vocals
Rick Derringer – guitar
Steve Buslowe – bass guitar
Roy Bittan – piano
Larry Fast – synthesizers
Steve Margoshes – additional synthesizers
Max Weinberg – drums
Jimmy Maelen – percussion
Rory Dodd – featured and backing vocals
Eric Troyer, Holly Sherwood – backing vocals

Other versions by Bonnie Tyler
Since the original release in 1983, Tyler has re-recorded the song several times for albums and subsequent single releases. Her first and most successful re-recording of the song was released in 2003. Tyler recorded a French/English duet version called "Si demain... (Turn Around)" with Kareen Antonn. It peaked at number one in France and Belgium. Tyler released another version of the song in 2004 as a duet with Peter Brocklehurst on his album For You. A solo version of the recording was released on her studio album Wings the following year.

BabyPinkStar recorded the song with Tyler in a punk/electronic remix version that was released as a single in the UK in January 2007. In 2009, Tyler released another version of the song with Welsh choral group Only Men Aloud! In 2011, Tyler re-recorded the song on an EP named after the song, released by Cleopatra Records. Her most recent recording of the song appears as a bonus track on her album Rocks and Honey (2013).

In 2021, Tyler released a classical-dance version of the song which features on the album Classical 80s Dance by German producer Alex Christensen.

Nicki French version

English singer Nicki French released a hi-NRG remake of "Total Eclipse of the Heart" in October 1994 that was also a worldwide hit. It was included on her debut album, Secrets (1995). The song originally peaked at No. 54 on the UK Singles Chart in 1994 but reached No. 5 after being re-issued in January 1995. In the United States, French's version peaked at No. 2 on the Billboard Hot 100, and it garnered frequent airplay on AC radio. It enjoyed greater success in Australia, spending four nonconsecutive weeks at No. 2. Elsewhere, the cover reached number 13 in New Zealand, number 16 in Canada, and peaked within the top 10 of several European countries.

Background and release
French had made her first dance version recording of "Total Eclipse of the Heart" in 1994: she had purchased the Bonnie Tyler original as a teenager in 1983 and reacted negatively to the original suggestion that she (French) remake the song as a dance track — "I thought, no, it's too strong a song to go down the dance route. You know, it demeans it almost. But then I thought well, I'll give it a go. And as soon as I heard the track, I thought it actually does work." The singer had been performing in London bands since the age of 12 and was given the chance to record a version when she received a phone call from a fellow British musician. French's first recording of "Total Eclipse of the Heart", made with John Springate of the Glitter Band producing, came to the attention of Mike Stock and Matt Aitken, who produced their own recording of the song by French, and it was this version which appeared on the UK chart dated 15 October 1994 at No. 54. French would recall: "I just thought oh well that was great...I've [worked with] Mike Stock and Matt Aitken and it was a dream come true...we tried and I had a great time...And then about two months later I had a call out of the blue from Mike saying the buzz will not die down on this track so we're going to re-record the beginning...and we're going to re-release it at the beginning of 1995."

According to French, her remake of "Total Eclipse of the Heart" became popular in the UK and the US in distinct remixes: "the slower version was the one that actually took a hold in the UK, where originally they started with the fast one and then decided to go with the [remix which began] in the same vein as the Bonnie Tyler version [and then] sped up when the chorus came in...In the US it was the [remix] which was fast all the way through." The single earned French two awards at the 1995 Hi-NRG Music Awards, in the categories for "Single of the Year" and "Best Female Vocal Performance". In 1996, the song was named "Best Hi-NRG 12-inch of the Year" at the International Dance Music Awards in Miami.

Music video
The song's accompanying music video features French performing on a stage, in front of a giant, circular "moon" that occasionally draws up to eclipse itself. Smoke appear as "clouds" and she is backed up by a band and two female backup singers. Sometimes a dancer also performs in front of the "moon". An alternate video also exists, set to the slower version of the song.

Critical reception
AllMusic editor Stephen Thomas Erlewine remarked that French "had a unexpected hit single with her dance-club, house-inflected cover" of "Total Eclipse of the Heart". He added that "although it was treated like a novelty at first, the version was as effective as the original and was a deserved success." Larry Flick from Billboard stated that the singer "does a fair imitation of Bonnie Tyler on this bouncy hi-NRG/disco interpretation of the bombastic power ballad. U.K. and European punters already have warmly embraced this twirler, and odds are an even 50-50 for similar success here." American entertainment company BuzzFeed ranked French's version number 26 in their "The 101 Greatest Dance Songs of the '90s" list in 2017. Steve Baltin from Cash Box felt that in the new version, "only the radio edit retains the syrupy feel that made Tyler’s song such a smash. 'Total Eclipse of the Heart' seems like it would be an odd choice for a dance cover, and this version confirms that suspicion... but it's still a hit." Dave Sholin from the Gavin Report named it Record To Watch, writing, "The song that never dies gets a '90s facelift and a tempo injection. Ten more believers." Robbie Daw from Idolator described it as a "simmering dance rendition", including it in their "The 50 Best Pop Singles of 1995" list in 2015. In his weekly UK chart commentary, James Masterton said that it "suffers from the inevitable dance beat tacked on and also the lack of Jim Steinman's bombastic production that made the track such an epic in the first place." Pan-European magazine Music & Media commented that "away is the sandpaper vocal of Bonny Tyler, the edge now comes from the dance context put into the ballad. Needless to say it's an upbeat song anno 1995. Top 10 in the UK."

Charts

Weekly charts

Year-end charts

Sales and certifications

Duet version with Kareen Antonn

In 2003, Tyler re-recorded "Total Eclipse of the Heart" as a bilingual duet with French singer Kareen Antonn. The new version, titled "Si demain... (Turn Around)", features French lyrics written by Emmanuel Pribys. It was released on 19 December 2003 by Yanis Records and appears on Tyler's 14th studio album, Simply Believe (2004). The song achieved platinum certification in Belgium and France, topping the charts in both countries.

Background and writing
In 2003, Kareen Antonn wrote to Tyler asking if she would be willing to record a French-English duet version of the song that was re-arranged by Antonn's friend Emmanuel Pribys. Tyler's initial reaction was to decline the request because Antonn was an unknown artist, "but they didn't give up," Tyler continued, "they sent me a CD of her voice singing the song in French. I always listen to things because you never know!" Tyler was impressed by the demo recording, and asked to sing the song live with her to ensure that her voice was strong enough and not reliant on studio editing.

Tyler flew to Paris and recorded the song with Antonn in just a couple of hours. Their demo recording was sent to various French radio stations. She explained to BBC News that the single was released three weeks earlier than planned "after people heard it on the radio and went into the shops trying to buy it." "Si demain... (Turn Around)" was released in France on 19 December 2003, and a few weeks later in Belgium and Switzerland, and later included on her 2004 album Simply Believe and Antonn's self-titled solo album as well as several 2004 compilation albums such as Le Meilleur des Voix, NRJ Hit Music Only, Fan 2, Girls 2004, and Duets.

After the unexpected success of the single, Antonn and Tyler decided to release another duet that they recorded; "Si tout s'arrête (It's a Heartache)" was released on 7 June 2004 but did not have the same success and peaked at number 12 on the week of its debut on the French SNEP Singles Chart. The song reached number 25 in Switzerland on 27 June 2004 and number seven in Belgium (Wallonia) on 3 July 2004.

Music video and lyrics
The video was filmed in Québec, Canada. Behind-the-scenes footage was featured on Tyler's 2006 DVD Bonnie on Tour.

Antonn and Tyler sing while they are sitting in front of a snowed up chalet. Antonn has a puppy in her arms, while Tyler drinks a cup of coffee. We learn during the video that Antonn left her boyfriend by writing a split letter to him while he slept. She hitch hiked and was picked up by Tyler. At the end of the video, the two singers play with dogs in snow.

"Si demain... (Turn Around)" is a bilingual pop rock song, recorded in English and French. Antonn sings all French verses, while Tyler sings all English passages. When one of them sings the verses, the other repeats "Je tourne en rond" (Tyler)/"Turn around" (Antonn) at the end of each one of these verses. In the chorus, while the first is entirely in French, the second is sung respectively in English by Tyler and in French by Antonn.

Release and promotion
"Si demain... (Turn Around)" was released on 19 December 2003, three weeks earlier than planned, due to a surge in demand following promotional radio airplay. Tyler and Antonn performed the song on various national TV networks in France, including TF1, M6 and France 3. In 2004, they recorded a second bilingual duet of "It's a Heartache" which charted in Belgium, France and Switzerland.

Critical reception
The song was generally well received by the musical critics. Platine, a French magazine, asserted that with this duet, "Bonnie Tyler came back to the foreground" and said the song was particularly successful in France because in 2004 "a certain fashion for transborder duets". According to French chart expert Elia Habib, this hit single "cements the return of duets in which the language of Molière and that of Shakespeare intermingle successfully. Such a bi-lingual song had not approached the top of the charts since December 1994, when the duet "7 Seconds" by Youssou N'Dour and Neneh Cherry spent 16 weeks at the top." As for the official Ultratop 50 Belgian Chart Website, it stated: "With Kareen Antonn, a new revelation, Bonnie Tyler could experience a real come-back. They have gilded some Bonnie's old hits, put a touch of French and bingo !" Music Actu stated the song was "among the most popular singles of French public" when it was released and noted its good performances on the charts.

Formats and track listings
 Digital download (since 2005) CD single (3 versions)Chart performances and sales
On the French SNEP Singles Chart, the single debuted at number 25 on 21 December 2003. It reached the top ten two weeks later and became number one in its fifth week. The single regained the number one spot on three occasions during the ten weeks at number one. It remained on the chart for 25 weeks, achieved Platinum status for over 500,000 copies sold, and was the fourth best-selling single of 2004 in France. "Si demain... (Turn Around)" is the only female duet number one single since the creation of French Top 50. It is also the single which made the biggest drop from number one, dropping directly to number ten. It also gave Bonnie Tyler the record of the longest time gap between top ten singles in France. Eighteen years passed between her hit "If You Were a Woman (And I Was a Man)" which reached number six in 1986 and of "Si demain... (Turn Around)", hitting number one. The previous record, by Marc Lavoine, was 17 years old.

In Belgium (Wallonia), the song went to number one two weeks after its debut at number 21, and remained number one from 21 February to 10 April 2004, i.e. eight weeks. It stayed in the top 40 for 24 weeks. It was certified Platinum after eleven weeks on the chart. It was the second best-selling single of 2004 and totaled 31 weeks on the chart. In Switzerland, the single peaked at number seven for four weeks and remained on the chart for 34 weeks. "Si demain... (Turn Around)" was also broadcast on radio in Russia and Poland where it reached number one on local radios as well as on the main chart.. Successive positions (from 17 March to 17 June 2004) : 19 15 9 1 3 1 4 2 6 2 7 11 10 4 13 4 8 1 2 6 2 1 6 11 8 11 6 3 3 10 5 9 14 20 16 18 14 11 9 6 3 8 3 2 5 10 6 14 6 3 5 2 5 1 5 3 6 15 16 20 14 1 6 14 20 The song was number six on the 2004 International List of French-speaking Music, compiled in collaboration with 122 radio stations throughout the world.

As of August 2014, the song was the 26th best-selling single of the 21st century in France, with 508,000 units sold. However, when she participated in the French show La Méthode Cauet, Kareen Antonn affirmed that the single, then still ranked on the French Singles Chart, had exceeded the 700,000 sold copies. Worldwide, the song has sold more than 2 million copies (physical sales and digital downloads).

Charts and certifications

Peak positions

Year-end charts

Certifications

Credits and personnel
 

 Music / Text : Jim Steinman, Emmanuel Pribys
 Producers : Faouze, Krem, Wallid Barkati
 Executive producer : Lynda Ramdane
 Artistic direction : Yanis Records

 French adaptation : Emmanuel Pribys
 Chorus : F. Llado, J.-N. Sombrun, F. Godebout, D. Goury, M. Ducret, J. Stage, B. Bishop
 Guitar : S. Heurtault, K. Rustam
 Bass : J. Stage

Cover versions of the duet version
In 2004, Lucie and Sandy, two contestants of the French television show Star Academy 4, covered this song on one of the Friday weekly shows.

On 30 March 2004, on the Worldbest competition which brings together winners of various broadcasts of Star Academy, the two finalists, Wilfred Le Bouthillier and Marie-Élaine Thibert, performed "Si demain... (Turn Around)", gaining the second place. In 2005, they released the single in Canada under the title "Et si demain"; their version differs from "Si demain... (Turn Around)" as a verse was removed and there are more refrains toward the end of the song. They also performed "Et si demain" on 18 September 2004, on the show La Fureur on SRC, and on 19 April 2004 on TVA. Le Bouthillier and Thibert's version was in turn covered by K4T and Luc St-Pierre on the Canadian TV show Heure de Gloire.

In 2007, Isabelle Delobel and Olivier Schoenfelder, two French professional figure skaters, carried out their performance to "Si demain...(Turn Around)" in "Stars sur glace", at the Palais omnisports de Paris-Bercy, broadcast on Paris Première (the song features on the programme of their 2006–2007 figure skating season).

Other cover versions
Lissette version
Cuban-American singer Lissette covered the song in Spanish as "Eclipse Total del Amor" in 1984, from her album Caricatura, being her best hit in the Latin American charts. The secondary male voice was sung by Cuban-American singer Jon Secada.

Jan Wayne version
German electronic dance music producer Jan Wayne released his version in 2001. It peaked at No. 28 on the UK Singles Chart in 2003.

Yuridia version
Mexican singer Yuridia covered the song in Spanish as "Eclipse Total del Amor" from her second studio album Habla El Corazón in 2006. The single peaked at number 36 on the Billboard Latin Pop Songs chart.

Westlife version

Irish boy band Westlife recorded a cover of the song on their 2006 album The Love Album. The song was to be released as the album's second single but was cancelled due to their Love Tour conflicts. Three official remixes were produced for their version as well as a remix done by Jim Steinman, which was ultimately rejected by the record label but has since surfaced on the Internet. The song was released as a promotional single in 2007. The Sunset Strippers Radio Mix version of the song charted at number 210 on the Official Russian Top Radio Hits Chart on 26 February 2007. It was composed in the traditional verse–chorus form in Bb major, with Filan and Feehily's vocal ranging from the chords of C4 to C6.Promotional CD single'''
"Total Eclipse of the Heart" (Sunset Strippers Verse Club Mix)
"Total Eclipse of the Heart" (Sunset Strippers Dub Mix)
"Total Eclipse of the Heart" (Sunset Strippers Radio Edit)

L'Aura version
Italian singer L'Aura covered the song in Italian as "Eclissi del cuore" from her third studio album Sei come me in 2010, which was not originally released as a single. One year later, a new version of the song, now a duet with fellow Italian singer Nek was officially released as a single, this duet peaking at number 6 on the Italian charts.

Glee cast version
The hit musical comedy-drama series Glee reworked the song for its season one episode "Bad Reputation," recorded by cast members Lea Michele, Cory Monteith, Mark Salling, and special guest star Jonathan Groff as their characters Rachel Berry, Finn Hudson, Noah Puckerman, and Jesse St. James respectively. It was released as a single and reached number 17 in Canada, 28 in Australia, 9 in the UK, and 16 in the US. It appears in the soundtrack album Glee: The Music, Volume 3 Showstoppers.

Parody versions
A parody of the song and music video were published in 2009, in what the fans and makers call a "literal video version", which is a type of video that replaces the original song lyrics with humorous lyrics describing the images in the video. Time magazine'' listed it as the 6th best viral video of 2009. This was also the 6th literal video produced by professional video editor David A. Scott Jr.; the singer who performed for this re-dub was Scott's friend Felisha Noble using the pseudonym Persephone Maewyn.

In 2010, Tyler appeared in an advertisement for MasterCard, performing a short parody of the song with its noted new lyric "Turn around, Neville." She performed the original song in a similar advertisement for Westpac in 2012.

Warby Parker produced a parody video in anticipation of the solar eclipse of 21 August 2017.

The Marsh Family, a couple with four children in Faversham, Kent, produced a parody titled "Totally Fixed Where We Are" expressing the feelings of people under a third lockdown during the COVID-19 pandemic, which went viral in February 2021.

See also
1983 in British music
List of Billboard Hot 100 number-one singles of 1983
List of Billboard Mainstream Top 40 number-one songs of the 1990s
List of Cash Box Top 100 number-one singles of 1983
List of number-one singles of 1983 (Australia)
List of number-one singles of 1983 (Canada)
List of number-one singles of 1983 (Ireland)
List of number-one singles from the 1980s (New Zealand)
List of RPM number-one dance singles of 1995
List of UK Singles Chart number ones of the 1980s
VG-lista 1964 to 1994
List of French number-one hits of 2004
Ultratop 40 number-one hits of 2004

References

1983 songs
1983 singles
1980s ballads
1994 debut singles
1995 singles
Pop ballads
Rock ballads
Bonnie Tyler songs
Nicki French songs
Westlife songs
Yuridia songs
Song recordings produced by Jim Steinman
Songs written by Jim Steinman
Song recordings with Wall of Sound arrangements
Billboard Hot 100 number-one singles
Cashbox number-one singles
Irish Singles Chart number-one singles
RPM Top Singles number-one singles
UK Singles Chart number-one singles
Music videos directed by Russell Mulcahy
Number-one singles in Australia
Number-one singles in New Zealand
Number-one singles in Norway
Number-one singles in South Africa
Ultratop 50 Singles (Wallonia) number-one singles
SNEP Top Singles number-one singles
Mega Records singles
Columbia Records singles
Sony BMG singles
Sony Music singles
CBS Records singles